Arly Golombek is a professional horse rider from Detroit, Michigan.

Early life and career 
Golombek was born on August 17, 1983, in Detroit, Michigan. She attended Michigan State University for business management and started riding horses at age 9. She become a professional equestrian since age of 23 and has been competing internationally since age 30 as a member of the Israeli showjumping team. Golombek has won an International high jump 6 bar competition in Biarritz France with her mare Dolce Vita and has also won a team bronze and individual silver in Maccabi games 2019 with her mare Vanilla Mail. She got 4th Place in the Prix of Macôn in 2019 with a stallion named Very Good de la Bonn. She also won the open national division champion with her horse vanilla Mail 2020. She is one of the sponsored riders of Parlanti, a premium equestrian boot designer from Italy.

References 

Living people
1983 births
People from Detroit